Martha Kniess Laning (born 1962/1963) was the chairwoman of the Democratic Party of Wisconsin. A businesswoman, activist, and politician from Port Edwards, Wisconsin, she was elected Democratic chairwoman on June 5, 2015 and was succeeded by Ben Wikler on July 1, 2019.

Life and political career 
Laning received her undergraduate and master's degrees from the University of Wisconsin.  She was employed by Target Stores and Kraft Foods before moving to Plymouth, Wisconsin, where she worked as executive director of the Plymouth Intergenerational Center. She was also one of the founders of the organization, which was started in 2009. While she was at the organization, she helped raise around $4.7 million to build the center. She resigned as director "for personal reasons" in 2013.

In 2013, Laning announced that she would challenge state Senator Joe Leibham, a Republican, for reelection to his 9th District. This would be her first time running for office as she had no prior political experience. However, Laning felt that her fundraising skills would give her an advantage in the race. Leibham did not seek reelection, instead pursuing the Republican congressional nomination for Wisconsin's 6th congressional district, so Laning faced Sheboygan County Board Chairman Devin LeMahieu in the 2014 general election.  Laning was defeated in the election, losing by about 20 percentage points.

In 2015, Laning announced her candidacy to succeed outgoing Democratic Party of Wisconsin chairman Mike Tate.  The campaign for the chairmanship was crowded and contentious; Laning faced former party chair Joe Wineke, Milwaukee consultant Jason Rae, and former state representatives Jeff Smith and Stephen Smith.  Prior to the party convention in Milwaukee, Jeff Smith controversially offered Laning the party's executive directorship if she exited the race; she declined the offer, while Smith ultimately dropped out of the race and endorsed Laning. On June 5, 2015, she was elected chairwoman at the party's annual convention in Milwaukee receiving 721 votes to Rae's 428 and Wineke's 191.

Laning was a super-delegate, and pledged support to whoever won the presidential primary in Wisconsin. Despite this statement, the primary was won by Bernie Sanders and Laning cast her vote for Hillary Clinton.

In July 2017, Laning was re-elected to the head of the Democratic Party of Wisconsin. She had three challengers for the seat of head of party.

References

External links

1960s births
Democratic Party of Wisconsin chairs
Living people
People from Plymouth, Wisconsin
University of Wisconsin–Madison alumni
Wisconsin Democrats
Year of birth missing (living people)